This is a list of add-ons for Internet Explorer, which include extensions and toolbars. They are to be used in conjunction with Internet Explorer, and not alone, as they depend on services provided by the browser, or its accompanying Windows RSS Platform.

Extensions

Toolbars

Shells

See also
List of Firefox extensions
Browser Helper Object
Comparison of browser synchronizers

References

External links
 Official Internet Explorer Add-on site

Internet Explorer add-ons